William Roy Mettler, Jr. (born October 15, 1946) is an American former competition swimmer and former world record-holder.

Mettler represented the United States at the 1964 Summer Olympics in Tokyo.  He swam for the gold medal-winning U.S. team in the qualifying heats of the men's 4×200-meter freestyle relay.  Mettler did not receive a medal; he was ineligible under the 1964 swimming rules because he did not swim in the event final.

Mettler attended Yale University, where he swam for coach Phil Moriarty's Yale Bulldogs swimming and diving team in National Collegiate Athletic Association (NCAA) and Ivy League competition from 1962 to 1964.

See also
 List of Yale University people
 World record progression 4 × 200 metres freestyle relay

References

External links
 

1946 births
Living people
American male freestyle swimmers
Olympic swimmers of the United States
Sportspeople from Springfield, Ohio
Swimmers at the 1964 Summer Olympics
Yale Bulldogs men's swimmers